Edouard Fesinger was a Belgian sport shooter. Competing for Belgium, he won a silver medal in team clay pigeons at the 1920 Summer Olympics in Antwerp.

References

Date of birth unknown
Date of death unknown
Belgian male sport shooters
Olympic shooters of Belgium
Olympic silver medalists for Belgium
Shooters at the 1920 Summer Olympics
Medalists at the 1920 Summer Olympics
Olympic medalists in shooting
20th-century Belgian people